The Seven Dolors Catholic Church is a Catholic church in Manhattan, Kansas, United States, and is the see of the Seven Dolors Parish, which also contains Saint Patrick's Church in Ogden. The Parish is the easternmost in the Salina Diocese.

Built in 1920, the church was added to the National Register of Historic Places in 1995.

References

External links

 Seven Dolors Catholic Church

Churches on the National Register of Historic Places in Kansas
Roman Catholic churches completed in 1920
Buildings and structures in Riley County, Kansas
Churches in the Roman Catholic Diocese of Salina
Manhattan, Kansas
National Register of Historic Places in Riley County, Kansas
Romanesque Revival architecture in Kansas
20th-century Roman Catholic church buildings in the United States